GW may refer to:

People
 George Washington, the first president of the United States
 Gene Wilder, American actor and comedian

Places
 Gawok railway station, a railway station in Indonesia (station code)
 George Washington Bridge across the Hudson River
 Guinea-Bissau, by ISO country code

Education
George Washington University, in Washington, D.C.
GW Law School in Washington, D.C.
GW Business School
GW School of Engineering & Applied Science
George Washington University Hospital in Washington, D.C.

Arts and media
 GateWorld, an English-language fan-news webpage
 Gazeta Wyborcza, a Polish newspaper
Ghost Whisperer, a CBS television show, 2005–2010
 Ghostwriter, a person hired to author texts that are credited to another person
Golden Words, a student publication of Queen's University in Kingston, Ontario
 Guild Wars, an episodic series of multiplayer online role-playing games

Science and technology
 .gw, the Internet top-level domain of Guinea-Bissau
 GW approximation, in physics, an estimate of the self-energy of a many-body system
 GW-BASIC, a dialect of BASIC programming language developed by Microsoft
 Gigawatt (GW), a unit for measuring power, equal to 109 watts
 Global warming
 Gravitational waves, ripples in the curvature of spacetime that propagate as waves
 A prefix to the name of a particular gravitational wave observation
 GW, an alternative signifier for the human gene MASTL

Other uses
 Games Workshop, a publicly traded company that makes war games
 Gateway (disambiguation)
 Gesamtkatalog der Wiegendrucke, a German catalogue of incunabula
 Golden Week (Japan), a period containing a number of holidays